Willie Joe Ligon (October 11, 1936 - December 11, 2016), known professionally as Joe Ligon, was an American gospel singer. He was associated with Mighty Clouds of Joy.

Life and career
Ligon was born in an African-American family in 1936 in Alabama, U.S. He spent his early life in Detroit. Later, at the age of 14, he moved to Los Angeles to start a gospel quartet.

In 1955, he became part of Mighty Clouds of Joy.

In 2016, he died at the age of 80.

Discography
 "Time"
 "Mighty High"
 "Walk Around Heaven" by James Cleveland and Cassetta George
 "Everybody Ought To Praise His Name"
 "Heavy Load"

References

1936 births
2016 deaths
American gospel musicians